Candy Mountain is a 1987 drama film directed by Robert Frank and Rudy Wurlitzer, and starring Kevin J. O'Connor, Harris Yulin and Tom Waits. Set in New York City and Cape Breton, Nova Scotia, it is categorized as a drama and road movie, drawing heavy inspiration from 1960s genres of film and music. The film premiered at the 1987 Locarno Film Festival.

Frank's third collaboration with American novelist and screenwriter Wurlitzer, the latter explains the story as a combination of the lives of both him and Frank. He stated, "We both live in New York and we both have houses in Cape Breton. In a way Elmore's route was the same as ours. Music and musicians, their dilemmas and lifestyles, mean a lot to Robert and myself."

Plot
Set in New York City, Candy Mountain tells the tale of a struggling guitarist named Julius. After he promises a rock star he can find an elusive guitar maker and acquire his valuable products, he sets off on a quest to Canada to find the legendary Elmore Silk, in order to strike a deal with him. Along his journey via T-Bird, Volkswagen, and hitchhiking, he experiences a series of encounters and misadventures with those who claim to have known the reclusive Silk. Each encounter provides him with valuable insight into the kind of man Silk is, and his journey is filled with "musicians playing small roles: David Johansen as the star who wants to buy up the guitars, Tom Waits as Elmore's middle-class brother, Joe Strummer as a punk, Dr. John as Elmore's cranky son-in-law, Leon Redbone as one-half of a peculiar Canadian family who enjoy imprisoning passers-by". As he ventures further North, and reaches Canada, he is finally in the presence of the famous guitar maker he had been searching for. Once he meets Silk, he is faced with the realization that financial gain is nothing compared to the development of one's artistic ability.

Cast

 Kevin J. O'Connor as Julius
 Harris Yulin as Elmore Silk
 Tom Waits as Al Silk
 Bulle Ogier as Cornelia
 Roberts Blossom as Archie
 Leon Redbone as Leon
 Dr. John as Henry
 Rita MacNeil as Winnie 
 Joe Strummer as Mario
 Laurie Metcalf as Alice
 Jayne Eastwood as Lucille
 Kazuko Oshima as Koko Yamamoto
 Eric Mitchell as Gunther 
 Mary Joy as Couple
 Robert Joy as Couple
 Arto Lindsay as Alston 
 Mary Margaret O'Hara as Darlene
 David Johansen as Keith Burns
 Tony 'Machine' Krasinski as Musician
 Susan Kirschner as Suzie
 Dee De Antonio as Lou Sultan
 Jose Soto as Musician's Son
 Bob Maroff as Gas-station Attendant
 Rockets Redglare as Van Driver 
 Nancy Fish as Maid
 Dan Archie Cummings as Gas-station Owner 
 Liz Porrazzo as Lola 
 Roy MacEachern as Customs Officer
 Wayne Robson as Buddy Burke
 Eric House as Doctor

Production
In an interview, Robert Frank stated that the film reflected his own life and journey from New York City to Nova Scotia. Additional inspiration was drawn partially from Wurlitzer's previous films and his experience of having a career on the road. The film's script was developed from a book of photography that was built upon Frank and Wurlitzer's experiences from living in Nova Scotia. The portrayal of the United States in the film is that of a "twisted industrial landscape", whereas Canada is seen as a "slow, peaceful land". The central theme of the film is the journey between the two countries, and is "exemplary of the road film genre". Frank credits his opportunity to live quietly and view nature as contributing to his own self betterment  and his work as a filmmaker, which he exemplifies in the film.

Reception

Release
The film had it world premiere on August 10, 1987 at the Locarno Film Festival. It was also featured in the 1987 Festival of Festivals (now the Toronto International Film Festival) at the Roy Thompson Hall in Toronto. The film was shown during the closing night of the festival in the Perspective Canada Section, alongside Jacqueline Levitin's Eva: Guerrillera (1988), and John N. Smith's National Film Board of Canada production Train of Dreams (1987). The film received mostly favorable views from the festival goers and was considered a critical success.

Critical response
The film generally received positive reviews from critics. Caryn James of The New York Times wrote, "...seems to be a small, quirky film, but it easily assumes the weight, ambition and success that many larger films aim for and miss." 
A review published in the August 25, 1988 edition of The Herald writes, "You might think that a movie directed by a still photographer would have a static, composed quality, but Frank goes the opposite way, to a raw, gritty sense of life. Life may not be a candy mountain, but Candy Mountain finds some unexpectedly sweet moments."
J. Hoberman of The Village Voice wrote, "In a way, this shaggy-dog hipster road film is Frank's ultimate work -- evoking the end of the road and even the end of Endsville-but he has persevered."
Despite mostly favourable reviews for the film, O'Connor's performance was criticized, with the Ottawa Citizen stating that "if [the production] had cast a different lead (someone like Mickey Rourke would have been ideal), Candy Mountain would have been much better than it is".
As of March 2018, film review aggregator Rotten Tomatoes had issued a 100% rating based on reviews from 8 critics.

Awards
San Sebastián International Film Festival
 1987: Won, "Silver Seashell Award"

References

External links
 
1987 films
Swiss drama films
Canadian drama films
French drama films
English-language Canadian films
English-language French films
English-language Swiss films
1987 drama films
Swiss independent films
Films shot in Nova Scotia
Canadian independent films
1987 independent films
French independent films
1980s English-language films
1980s Canadian films
1980s French films